Szily or Szili is a Hungarian habitational surname for someone from the village Szil. Notable persons with the surname include:

 János Szily (1735-1799), Hungarian Bishop
 József Szily (1913–1976), Hungarian chess master
 Katalin Szili (born 1956), Hungarian politician
 Pál Szily (1878–1945), Hungarian chemist

Hungarian-language surnames
Hungarian toponymic surnames